Kamala Devi Harris (born October 20, 1964) is an American politician and attorney who is the 49th and current vice president of the United States. She is the first female vice president and the highest-ranking female official in U.S. history, as well as the first African American and first Asian American vice president. A member of the Democratic Party, she previously served as the attorney general of California from 2011 to 2017 and as a United States senator representing California from 2017 to 2021.

Born in Oakland, California, Harris graduated from Howard University and the University of California, Hastings College of the Law. She began her career in the Alameda County District Attorney's Office, before being recruited to the San Francisco District Attorney's Office and later the City Attorney of San Francisco's office. In 2003, she was elected district attorney of San Francisco. She was elected Attorney General of California in 2010 and re-elected in 2014. Harris served as the junior United States senator from California from 2017 to 2021. Harris defeated Loretta Sanchez in the 2016 Senate election to become the second African American woman and the first South Asian American to serve in the United States Senate. As a senator, she advocated for healthcare reform, federal de-scheduling of cannabis, a path to citizenship for undocumented immigrants, the DREAM Act, a ban on assault weapons, and progressive tax reform. She gained a national profile for her pointed questioning of Trump administration officials during Senate hearings, including Trump's second Supreme Court nominee Brett Kavanaugh, who was accused of sexual assault.

Harris sought the 2020 Democratic presidential nomination, but withdrew from the race prior to the primaries. Joe Biden selected her as his running mate and their ticket went on to defeat the incumbent president, Donald Trump, and vice president, Mike Pence, in the 2020 election. Harris became vice president upon being inaugurated on January 20, 2021, alongside President Joe Biden.

Early life, family and education (1964–1990) 

Kamala Devi Harris was born in Oakland, California, on October 20, 1964. Her mother, Shyamala Gopalan, a Tamil Indian biologist, whose work on the progesterone receptor gene stimulated advances in breast cancer research, had arrived in the United States from India in 1958 as a 19-year-old graduate student in nutrition and endocrinology at the University of California, Berkeley; Gopalan received her PhD in 1964. Harris's Jamaican-American father, Donald J. Harris, a Stanford University professor emeritus of economics, arrived in the United States from British Jamaica in 1961, for graduate study at UC Berkeley, receiving a PhD in economics in 1966. Donald Harris met his future wife Shyamala Gopalan at a college club for African-American students (though Indian, Gopalan was allowed to join).

In 1966, Harris moved to Champaign, Illinois (where her younger sister Maya was born) as her parents took positions at the University of Illinois. The family moved around the Midwest, with both parents working at multiple universities in succession over a brief period. Harris, along with her mother and sister, moved back to California in 1970, while her father remained in the Midwest. They stayed briefly on Milvia Street in central Berkeley, then at a duplex on Bancroft Way in West Berkeley, an area often called the "flatlands" with a significant black population. When Harris began kindergarten, she was bused as part of Berkeley's comprehensive desegregation program to Thousand Oaks Elementary School, a public school in a more prosperous neighborhood in northern Berkeley which previously had been 95 percent white, and after the desegregation plan went into effect became 40 percent Black.

A neighbor regularly took the Harris girls to an African American church in Oakland where they sang in the children's choir, and the girls and their mother also frequently visited a nearby African American cultural center. Their mother introduced them to Hinduism and took them to a nearby Hindu temple, where she occasionally sang. As children, she and her sister visited their mother's family in Madras (now Chennai) several times. She says she has been strongly influenced by her maternal grandfather P. V. Gopalan, a retired Indian civil servant whose progressive views on democracy and women's rights impressed her. Harris has remained in touch with her Indian aunts and uncles throughout her adult life. Harris has also visited her father's family in Jamaica.

Her parents divorced when she was seven. Harris has said that when she and her sister visited their father in Palo Alto on weekends, other children in the neighborhood were not allowed to play with them because they were black.
When she was twelve, Harris and her sister moved with their mother to Montreal, Quebec, where Shyamala had accepted a research and teaching position at the McGill University-affiliated Jewish General Hospital. Harris attended a French-speaking primary school, Notre-Dame-des-Neiges, then F.A.C.E. School, and finally Westmount High School in Westmount, Quebec, graduating in 1981. Wanda Kagan, a high school friend of Harris, later told CBC News in 2020 that Harris was her best friend and described how she confided in Harris that Kagan had been molested by her stepfather. She said that Harris told her mother, who then insisted Kagan come to live with them for the remainder of her final year of high school. Kagan said Harris had recently told her that their friendship, and playing a role in countering Kagan's exploitation, helped form the commitment Harris felt in protecting women and children as a prosecutor. After high school, in 1982, Harris attended Howard University, a historically black university in Washington, D.C. While at Howard, she interned as a mailroom clerk for California senator Alan Cranston, chaired the economics society, led the debate team, and joined Alpha Kappa Alpha sorority. Harris graduated from Howard in 1986 with a degree in political science and economics.

Harris then returned to California to attend law school at the University of California, Hastings College of the Law through its Legal Education Opportunity Program (LEOP). While at UC Hastings, she served as president of its chapter of the Black Law Students Association. She graduated with a Juris Doctor in 1989 and was admitted to the California Bar in June 1990.

Early career (1990–2004) 
In 1990, Harris was hired as a deputy district attorney in Alameda County, California, where she was described as "an able prosecutor on the way up". In 1994, Speaker of the California Assembly Willie Brown, who was then dating Harris, appointed her to the state Unemployment Insurance Appeals Board and later to the California Medical Assistance Commission. Harris took a six-month leave of absence in 1994 from her duties, then afterward resumed as prosecutor during the years she sat on the boards. Harris's connection to Brown was noted in media reportage as part of a pattern of Californian political leaders appointing "friends and loyal political soldiers" to lucrative positions on the commissions. Harris has defended her work.

In February 1998, San Francisco district attorney Terence Hallinan recruited Harris as an assistant district attorney. There, she became the chief of the Career Criminal Division, supervising five other attorneys, where she prosecuted homicide, burglary, robbery, and sexual assault casesparticularly three-strikes cases. In 2000, Harris reportedly clashed with Hallinan's assistant, Darrell Salomon, over Proposition21, which granted prosecutors the option of trying juvenile defendants in Superior Court rather than juvenile courts. Harris campaigned against the measure, which passed. Salomon opposed directing media inquiries about Prop21 to Harris and reassigned her, a de facto demotion. Harris filed a complaint against Salomon and quit.

In August 2000, Harris took a job at San Francisco City Hall, working for city attorney Louise Renne. Harris ran the Family and Children's Services Division representing child abuse and neglect cases. Renne endorsed Harris during her D.A. campaign.

In 2001, Harris briefly dated Montel Williams. Addressing the relationship, Williams tweeted in 2020, "Kamala Harris and I briefly dated about 20 years ago when we were both single. So what? I have great respect for Sen. Harris".

District Attorney of San Francisco (2004–2011) 

In 2002, Harris prepared to run for District Attorney of San Francisco against Hallinan (the incumbent) and Bill Fazio.
Harris was the least-known of the three candidates but persuaded the Central Committee to withhold its endorsement from Hallinan. Harris and Hallinan advanced to the general election runoff with 33 and 37 percent of the vote, respectively.

In the runoff, Harris pledged never to seek the death penalty and to prosecute three-strike offenders only in cases of violent felonies. Harris ran a "forceful" campaign, assisted by former mayor Willie Brown, Senator Dianne Feinstein, writer and cartoonist Aaron McGruder, and comedians Eddie Griffin and Chris Rock. Harris differentiated herself from Hallinan by attacking his performance. She argued that she left his office because it was technologically inept, emphasizing his 52-percent conviction rate for serious crimes despite an 83-percent average conviction rate statewide. Harris charged that his office was not doing enough to stem the city's gun violence, particularly in poor neighborhoods like Bayview and the Tenderloin, and attacked his willingness to accept plea bargains in cases of domestic violence. Harris won with 56 percent of the vote, becoming the first person of color elected as district attorney of San Francisco.

Harris ran unopposed for a second term in November 2007.

Public safety

Non-violent crimes 

In the summer of 2005, Harris created an environmental crimes unit.

In 2007, Harris and city attorney Dennis Herrera investigated San Francisco supervisor Ed Jew for violating residency requirements necessary to hold his supervisor position; Harris charged Jew with nine felonies, alleging that he had lied under oath and falsified documents to make it appear he resided in a Sunset District home, necessary so he could run for supervisor in the 4th district. Jew pleaded guilty in October 2008 to unrelated federal corruption charges (mail fraud, soliciting a bribe, and extortion)
and pleaded guilty the following month in state court to a charge of perjury for lying about his address on nomination forms, as part of a plea agreement in which the other state charges were dropped and Jew agreed to never again hold elected office in California. Harris described the case as "about protecting the integrity of our political process, which is part of the core of our democracy".
For his federal offenses, Jew was sentenced to 64 months in federal prison and a $10,000 fine; for the state perjury conviction, Jew was sentenced to one year in county jail, three years' probation, and about $2,000 in fines.

Under Harris, the D.A.'s office obtained more than 1,900 convictions for marijuana offenses, including persons simultaneously convicted of marijuana offenses and more serious crimes. The rate at which Harris's office prosecuted marijuana crimes was higher than the rate under Hallinan, but the number of defendants sentenced to state prison for such offenses was substantially lower.
Prosecutions for low-level marijuana offenses were rare under Harris, and her office had a policy of not pursuing jail time for marijuana possession offenses.
Harris's successor as D.A., George Gascón, expunged all San Francisco marijuana offenses going back to 1975.

Violent crimes 
In the early 2000s, the San Francisco murder rate per capita outpaced the national average. Within the first six months of taking office, Harris cleared 27 of 74 backlogged homicide cases by settling 14 by plea bargain and taking 11 to trial; of those trials, nine ended with convictions and two with hung juries. She took 49 violent crime cases to trial and secured 36 convictions. From 2004 to 2006, Harris achieved an 87-percent conviction rate for homicides and a 90-percent conviction rate for all felony gun violations.

Harris also pushed for higher bail for criminal defendants involved in gun-related crimes, arguing that historically low bail encouraged outsiders to commit crimes in San Francisco. SFPD officers credited Harris with tightening the loopholes defendants had used in the past. In addition to creating a gun crime unit, Harris opposed releasing defendants on their own recognizance if they were arrested on gun crimes, sought minimum 90-day sentences for possession of concealed or loaded weapons, and charged all assault weapons possession cases as felonies, adding that she would seek prison terms for criminals who possessed or used assault weapons and would seek maximum penalties on gun-related crimes.

Harris created a Hate Crimes Unit, focusing on hate crimes against LGBT children and teens in schools. In early 2006, Gwen Araujo, a 17-year-old American Latina transgender teenager, was murdered by two men who later used the "gay panic defense" before being convicted of second-degree murder. Harris, alongside Araujo's mother Sylvia Guerrero, convened a two-day conference of at least 200 prosecutors and law enforcement officials nationwide to discuss strategies to counter such legal defenses. Harris subsequently supported A.B. 1160, the Gwen Araujo Justice for Victims Act, advocating that California's penal code include jury instructions to ignore bias, sympathy, prejudice, or public opinion in making their decision, also making mandatory for district attorney's offices in California to educate prosecutors about panic strategies and how to prevent bias from affecting trial outcomes.
In September 2006, California governor Arnold Schwarzenegger signed A.B. 1160 into law; the law put California on record as declaring it contrary to public policy for defendants to be acquitted or convicted of a lesser included offense on the basis of appeals to "societal bias".

In August 2007, state assemblyman Mark Leno introduced legislation to ban gun shows at the Cow Palace, joined by Harris, police chief Heather Fong, and mayor Gavin Newsom. City leaders contended the shows were directly contributing to the proliferation of illegal guns and spiking homicide rates in San Francisco. (Earlier that month Newsom had signed into law local legislation banning gun shows on city and county property.) Leno alleged that merchants drove through the public housing developments nearby and illegally sold weapons to residents. While the bill would stall, local opposition to the shows continued until the Cow Palace Board of Directors in 2019 voted to approve a statement banning all future gun shows.

Reform efforts

Death penalty 
Harris has said life imprisonment without parole is a better and more cost-effective punishment than the death penalty, and has estimated that the resultant cost savings could pay for a thousand additional police officers in San Francisco alone.

During her campaign, Harris pledged never to seek the death penalty.
After a San Francisco Police Department officer, Isaac Espinoza, was shot and killed in 2004, U.S. senator (and former San Francisco mayor) Dianne Feinstein, U.S. senator Barbara Boxer, Oakland mayor Jerry Brown, and the San Francisco Police Officers Association pressured Harris to reverse that position, but she did not. (Polls found that seventy percent of voters supported Harris's decision.) When Edwin Ramos, an illegal immigrant and alleged MS-13 gang member, was accused of murdering a man and his two sons in 2009, Harris sought a sentence of life in prison without parole, a decision Mayor Gavin Newsom backed.

Recidivism and re-entry initiative 
In 2004, Harris recruited civil rights activist Lateefah Simon to create the San Francisco Reentry Division. The flagship program was the Back on Track initiative, a first-of-its-kind reentry program for first-time nonviolent offenders aged 18–30. Initiative participants whose crimes were not weapon- or gang-related would plead guilty in exchange for a deferral of sentencing and regular appearances before a judge over a twelve- to eighteen-month period. The program maintained rigorous graduation requirements, mandating completion of up to 220 hours of community service, obtaining a high-school-equivalency diploma, maintaining steady employment, taking parenting classes, and passing drug tests. At graduation, the court would dismiss the case and expunge the graduate's record. Over six years, the 200 people graduated from the program had a recidivism rate of less than ten percent, compared to the 53 percent of California's drug offenders who returned to prison within two years of release. Back on Track earned recognition from the U.S. Department of Justice as a model for reentry programs. The DOJ found that the cost to the taxpayers per participant was markedly lower ($5,000) than the cost of adjudicating a case ($10,000) and housing a low-level offender ($50,000). In 2009, a state law (the Back on Track Reentry Act, A.B. 750) was enacted, encouraging other California counties to start similar programs.
Adopted by the National District Attorneys Association as a model, prosecutor offices in Baltimore, Philadelphia, and Atlanta have used Back on Track as a template for their own programs.

Truancy initiative 
In 2006, as part of an initiative to reduce the city's skyrocketing homicide rate, Harris led a city-wide effort to combat truancy for at-risk elementary school youth in San Francisco. Declaring chronic truancy a matter of public safety and pointing out that the majority of prison inmates and homicide victims are dropouts or habitual truants, Harris's office met with thousands of parents at high-risk schools and sent out letters warning all families of the legal consequences of truancy at the beginning of the fall semester, adding she would prosecute the parents of chronically truant elementary students; penalties included a $2,500 fine and up to a year in jail. The program was controversial when introduced.

In 2008, Harris issued citations against six parents whose children missed at least fifty days of school, the first time San Francisco prosecuted adults for student truancy. San Francisco's school chief, Carlos Garcia, said the path from truancy to prosecution was lengthy, and that the school district usually spends months encouraging parents through phone calls, reminder letters, private meetings, hearings before the School Attendance Review Board, and offers of help from city agencies and social services; two of the six parents entered no plea but said they would work with the D.A.'s office and social service agencies to create "parental responsibility plans" to help them start sending their children to school regularly. By April 2009, 1,330 elementary school students were habitual or chronic truants, down 23 percent from 1,730 in 2008, and down from 2,517 in 2007 and from 2,856 in 2006. Harris's office prosecuted seven parents in three years, with none jailed.

Attorney General of California (2011–2017)

Elections

2010 

Nearly two years before the 2010 election, Harris announced she planned to run. She also stated she would run only if then-Attorney General Jerry Brown did not seek re-election for that position. Brown instead chose to run for governor and Harris consolidated support from prominent California Democrats. Both of California's senators, Dianne Feinstein and Barbara Boxer, House Speaker Nancy Pelosi, United Farm Workers cofounder Dolores Huerta, and mayor of Los Angeles Antonio Villaraigosa all endorsed her during the Democratic primary. In the June 8, 2010, primary, she was nominated with 33.6 percent of the vote, defeating Alberto Torrico and Chris Kelly.

In the general election, she faced Republican Los Angeles County district attorney Steve Cooley, who led most of the race. Cooley ran as a nonpartisan, distancing himself from Republican gubernatorial candidate Meg Whitman's campaign. The election was held November2 but after a protracted period of counting mail-in and provisional ballots, Cooley conceded on November 25. Harris was sworn in on January 3, 2011; she is the first woman, the first African American, and the first South Asian American to hold the office of Attorney General in the state's history.

2014 

Harris announced her intention to run for re-election in February 2014 and filed paperwork to run on February 12. The Sacramento Bee, Los Angeles Daily News, and Los Angeles Times endorsed her for re-election.

On November 4, 2014, Harris was re-elected against Republican Ronald Gold, winning 57.5 percent of the vote to 42.5 percent.

Consumer protection

Fraud, waste, and abuse 

In 2011, Harris announced the creation of the Mortgage Fraud Strike Force in the wake of the 2010 United States foreclosure crisis. That same year, Harris obtained two of the largest recoveries in the history of California's False Claims Act$241million from Quest Diagnostics and then $323million from the SCAN healthcare networkover excess state Medi-Cal and federal Medicare payments.

In 2012, Harris leveraged California's economic clout to obtain better terms in the National Mortgage Settlement against the nation's five largest mortgage servicersJPMorgan Chase, Bank of America, Wells Fargo, Citigroup and Ally Bank. The mortgage firms were accused of illegally foreclosing on homeowners. After dismissing an initial offer of $2–4billion in relief for Californians, Harris withdrew from negotiations. The offer eventually was increased to $18.4billion in debt relief and $2billion in other financial assistance for California homeowners.

Harris worked with Assembly speaker John Pérez and Senate president pro tem Darrell Steinberg in 2013 to introduce the Homeowner Bill of Rights, considered one of the strongest protections nationwide against aggressive foreclosure tactics. The Homeowner Bill of Rights banned the practices of "dual-tracking" (processing a modification and foreclosure at the same time) and robo-signing and provided homeowners with a single point of contact at their lending institution. Harris achieved multiple nine-figure settlements for California homeowners under the bill mostly for robo-signing and dual-track abuses, as well as prosecuting instances in which loan processors failed to promptly credit mortgage payments, miscalculated interest rates, and charged borrowers improper fees. Harris secured hundreds of millions in relief, including $268million from Ocwen Financial Corporation, $470million from HSBC, and $550million from SunTrust Banks.

From 2013 to 2015, Harris pursued financial recoveries for California's public employee and teacher's pensions, CalPERS and CalSTRS against various financial giants for misrepresentation in the sale of mortgage-backed securities. She secured multiple nine-figure recoveries for the state pensions, recovering about $193million from Citigroup, $210million from S&P, $300million from JP Morgan Chase, and over half a billion from Bank of America.

In 2013, Harris declined to authorize a civil complaint drafted by state investigators who accused OneWest Bank, owned by an investment group headed by future U.S. treasury secretary Steven Mnuchin (then a private citizen), of "widespread violation" of California foreclosure laws. During the 2016 elections, Harris was the only Democratic Senate candidate to receive a donation from Mnuchin. Harris was criticized for accepting the donation because Mnuchin purportedly profited from the subprime mortgage crisis through OneWest Bank; she later voted against his confirmation as treasury secretary in February 2017. In 2019, Harris's campaign stated that the decision not to pursue prosecution hinged on the state's inability to subpoena OneWest. Her spokesman said, "There was no question OneWest conducted predatory lending, and Senator Harris believes they should be punished. Unfortunately, the law was squarely on their side and they were shielded from state subpoenas because they're a federal bank."

In 2014, Harris settled charges she had brought against rent-to-own retailer Aaron's, Inc. on allegations of incorrect late charges, overcharging customers who paid off their contracts before the due date, and privacy violations. In the settlement, the retailer refunded $28.4million to California customers and paid $3.4million in civil penalties.

In 2015, Harris obtained a $1.2 billion judgment against for-profit post-secondary education company Corinthian Colleges for false advertising and deceptive marketing targeting vulnerable, low-income students and misrepresenting job placement rates to students, investors, and accreditation agencies. The Court ordered Corinthian to pay $820million in restitution and another $350million in civil penalties. That same year, Harris also secured a $60million settlement with JP Morgan Chase to resolve allegations of illegal debt collection with respect to credit card customers, with the bank also agreeing to change practices that violated California consumer protection laws by collecting incorrect amounts, selling bad credit card debt, and running a debt-collection mill that "robo-signed" court documents without first reviewing the files as it rushed to obtain judgments and wage garnishments. As part of the settlement, the bank was required to stop attempting to collect on more than 528,000 customer accounts.

In 2015, Harris opened an investigation of the Office of Ratepayer Advocates, San Diego Gas and Electric, and Southern California Edison regarding the closure of San Onofre Nuclear Generating Station. California state investigators searched the home of California utility regulator Michael Peevey and found handwritten notes that allegedly showed he had met with an Edison executive in Poland, where the two had negotiated the terms of the San Onofre settlement, leaving San Diego taxpayers with a $3.3billion bill to pay for the closure of the plant. The investigation was closed amidst Harris's 2016 run for the U.S. Senate position.

Privacy rights 
In February 2012, Harris announced an agreement with Apple, Amazon, Google, Hewlett-Packard, Microsoft, and Research in Motion to mandate that apps sold in their stores display prominent privacy policies informing users of what private information they were sharing, and with whom. Facebook later joined the agreement. That summer, Harris announced the creation of a Privacy Enforcement and Protection Unit to enforce laws related to cyber privacy, identity theft, and data breaches. Later the same year, Harris notified a hundred mobile-app developers of their non-compliance with state privacy laws and asked them to create privacy policies or face a $2,500 fine each time a non-compliant app is downloaded by a resident of California.

In 2015, Harris secured two settlements with Comcast, one totaling $33million over allegations that it posted online the names, phone numbers and addresses of tens of thousands of customers who had paid for unlisted voice over internet protocol (VOIP) phone service and another $26million settlement to resolve allegations that it discarded paper records without first omitting or redacting private customer information. Harris also settled with Houzz over allegations that the company recorded phone calls without notifying customers or employees. Houzz was forced to pay $175,000, destroy the recorded calls, and hire a chief privacy officer, the first time such a provision has been included in a settlement with the California Department of Justice.

Criminal justice reform

Launch of Division of Recidivism Reduction and Re-Entry 
In November 2013, Harris launched the California Department of Justice's Division of Recidivism Reduction and Re-Entry in partnership with district attorney offices in San Diego, Los Angeles, and Alameda County. In March 2015, Harris announced the creation of a pilot program in coordination with the Los Angeles County Sheriff's Department called "Back on Track LA". Like Back on Track, first time, non-violent, non-sexual, offenders aged between 18 and 30 – 90 men participated in the pilot program for 24–30 months. Assigned a case manager, participants received education through a partnership with the Los Angeles Community College District and job training services.

Wrongful convictions and prison overcrowding 
Harris's record on wrongful conviction cases as attorney general has engendered criticism from academics and activists. Law professor Lara Bazelon contends Harris "weaponized technicalities to keep wrongfully convicted people behind bars rather than allow them new trials". After the 2011 United States Supreme Court decision in Brown v. Plata declared California's prisons so overcrowded they inflicted cruel and unusual punishment, Harris fought federal supervision, explaining "I have a client, and I don't get to choose my client." Harris declined to take any position on criminal sentencing-reform initiatives Prop36 (2012) and Prop47 (2014), arguing it would be improper because her office prepares the ballot booklets. John Van de Kamp, a predecessor as attorney general, publicly disagreed with the rationale.

In September 2014, Harris's office argued unsuccessfully in a court filing against the early release of prisoners, citing the need for inmate firefighting labor. When the memo provoked headlines, Harris spoke out against it, saying she was unaware that her office had produced the memo. Since the 1940s, qualified California inmates have the option of volunteering to receive comprehensive training from the Cal Fire in exchange for sentence reductions and more comfortable prison accommodations; prison firefighters receive about $2 a day, and another $1 when battling fires.

LGBT rights

Opposing Prop 8 

In 2008, California voters passed Prop8, a state constitutional amendment providing that only marriages "between a man and a woman" are valid. Legal challenges were made by opponents soon after its approval, and a pair of same-sex couples filed a lawsuit against the initiative in federal court in the case of Perry v. Schwarzenegger (later Hollingsworth v. Perry). In their 2010 campaigns, California attorney general Jerry Brown and Harris both pledged to not defend Prop8.

After being elected, Harris declared her office would not defend the marriage ban, leaving the task to Prop8's proponents. In February 2013, Harris filed an amicus curiae brief, arguing Prop8 was unconstitutional and that the initiative's sponsors did not have legal standing to represent California's interests by defending the law in federal court. In June 2013, the Supreme Court ruled, 5–4, that Prop8's proponents lacked standing to defend it in federal court. The next day Harris delivered a speech in downtown Los Angeles urging the Ninth Circuit to lift the stay banning same-sex marriages as soon as possible. The stay was lifted two days later.

Gay and trans panic defense ban 
In 2014, Attorney General Kamala Harris co-sponsored legislation to ban the gay and trans panic defense in court, which passed and California became the first state with such legislation.

Michelle-Lael B. Norsworthy v. Jeffrey Beard et al. 
In February 2014, Michelle-Lael Norsworthy, a transgender inmate at California's Mule Creek State Prison, filed a federal lawsuit based on the California Department of Corrections and Rehabilitation's failure to provide her with what she argued was medically necessary sex reassignment surgery (SRS). In April 2015, a federal judge ordered the state to provide Norsworthy with SRS, finding that prison officials had been "deliberately indifferent to her serious medical need". Harris, representing CDCR, appealed the order to the Ninth Circuit Court of Appeals, arguing that psychotherapy, as well as the hormone therapy Norsworthy had been receiving for her gender dysphoria over the preceding fourteen years, were sufficient medical treatment, and there was "no evidence that Norsworthy is in serious, immediate physical or emotional danger". While Harris defended the state's position in court, she said she ultimately pushed the California Department of Corrections and Rehabilitation to change their policy. In August 2015, while the state's appeal was pending, Norsworthy was released on parole, obviating the state's duty to provide her with inmate medical care and rendering the case moot. In 2019, Harris stated that she took "full responsibility" for briefs her office filed in Norsworthy's case and others involving access to gender-affirming surgery for trans inmates.

Public safety

Anti-truancy efforts 

In 2011, Harris urged criminal penalties for parents of truant children as she did as District Attorney of San Francisco, allowing the court to defer judgment if the parent agreed to a mediation period to get their child back in school. Critics charged that local prosecutors implementing her directives were overzealous in their enforcement and Harris's policy adversely affected families. In 2013, Harris issued a report titled "In School + On Track", which found that more than 250,000 elementary school students in the state were "chronically absent" and the statewide truancy rate for elementary students in the 2012–2013 school year was nearly thirty percent, at a cost of nearly $1.4billion to school districts, since funding is based on attendance rates.

Environmental protection 
Harris prioritized environmental protection as attorney general, first securing a $44million settlement to resolve all damages and costs associated with the Cosco Busan oil spill, in which a container ship collided with San Francisco–Oakland Bay Bridge and spilled 50,000gallons of bunker fuel into the San Francisco Bay. In the aftermath of the 2015 Refugio oil spill, which deposited about 140,000gallons of crude oil off the coast of Santa Barbara, California, Harris toured the coastline and directed her office's resources and attorneys to investigate possible criminal violations. Thereafter, operator Plains All American Pipeline was indicted on 46 criminal charges related to the spill, with one employee indicted on three criminal charges. In 2019, a Santa Barbara jury returned a verdict finding Plains guilty of failing to properly maintain its pipeline and another eight misdemeanor charges; they were sentenced to pay over $3million in fines and assessments.

From 2015 to 2016, Harris secured multiple multi-million-dollar settlements with fuel service companies Chevron, BP, ARCO, Phillips 66, and ConocoPhillips to resolve allegations they failed to properly monitor the hazardous materials in its underground storage tanks used to store gasoline for retail sale at hundreds of California gas stations. In summer 2016, automaker Volkswagen AG agreed to pay up to $14.7billion to settle a raft of claims related to so-called Defeat Devices used to cheat emissions standards on its diesel cars while actually emitting up to forty times the levels of harmful nitrogen oxides allowed under state and federal law. Harris and the chair of the California Air Resources Board, Mary D. Nichols, announced that California would receive $1.18billion as well as another $86million paid to the state of California in civil penalties.

Law enforcement 
California's Prop 69 (2004) required law enforcement to collect DNA samples from any adult arrested for a felony and from individuals arrested for certain crimes. In 2012, Harris announced that the California Department of Justice had improved its DNA testing capabilities such that samples stored at the state's crime labs could now be analyzed four times faster, within thirty days. Accordingly, Harris reported that the Rapid DNA Service Team within the Bureau of Forensic Services had cleared California's DNA backlog for the first time). Harris's office was later awarded a $1.6million grant from the Manhattan District Attorney's initiative to eliminate the backlogs of untested rape kits.

In 2015, Harris conducted a 90-day review of implicit bias in policing and police use of deadly force. In April 2015, Harris introduced the first of its kind "Principled Policing: Procedural Justice and Implicit Bias" training, designed in conjunction with Stanford University psychologist and professor Jennifer Eberhardt, to help law enforcement officers overcome barriers to neutral policing and rebuild trust between law enforcement and the community. All Command-level staff received the training. The training was part of a package of reforms introduced within the California Department of Justice, which also included additional resources deployed to increase the recruitment and hiring of diverse special agents, an expanded role for the department to investigate officer-related shooting investigations and community policing. The same year, Harris's California Department of Justice became the first statewide agency in the country to require all its police officers to wear body cameras. Harris also announced a new state law requiring every law enforcement agency in California to collect, report, and publish expanded statistics on how many people are shot, seriously injured or killed by peace officers throughout the state.

Later that year, Harris appealed a judge's order to take over the prosecution of a high-profile mass murder case and to eject all 250 prosecutors from the Orange County district attorney's office over allegations of misconduct by Republican D.A. Tony Rackauckas. Rackauckas was alleged to have illegally employed jailhouse informants and concealed evidence. Harris noted that it was unnecessary to ban all 250 prosecutors from working on the case, as only a few had been directly involved, later promising a narrower criminal investigation. The U.S. Department of Justice began an investigation into Rackauckas in December 2016, but he was not re-elected.

In 2016, Harris announced a patterns and practices investigation into purported civil rights violations and use of excessive force by the two largest law enforcement agencies in Kern County, California, the Bakersfield Police Department and the Kern County Sheriff's Department. Labeled the "deadliest police departments in America" in a five-part Guardian expose, a separate investigation commissioned by the ACLU and submitted to the California Department of Justice corroborated reports of police using excessive force.

Planned Parenthood 
In 2016, Harris's office seized videos and other information from the apartment of an antiabortion activist who had made secret recordings and then accused Planned Parenthood doctors of illegally selling fetal tissue. Harris had announced that her office would investigate the activist in the summer of 2015. She was facing increasing criticism for not taking public action by the time Planned Parenthood filed a lawsuit against the activist.

Sex crimes 
In 2011, Harris obtained a guilty plea and a four-year prison sentence from a stalker who used Facebook and social engineering techniques to illegally access the private photographs of women whose social media accounts he hijacked. Harris commented that the Internet had "opened up a new frontier for crime". Later that year, Harris created the eCrime Unit within the California Department of Justice, a 20-attorney unit targeting technology crimes. In 2015, several purveyors of so-called revenge porn sites based in California were arrested, charged with felonies, and sentenced to lengthy prison terms. In the first prosecution of its kind in the United States, Kevin Bollaert was convicted on 21 counts of identity theft and six counts of extortion and sentenced to 18 years in prison. Harris brought up these cases when California Congresswoman Katie Hill was targeted for similar cyber exploitation by her ex-husband and forced to resign in late 2019.

In 2016, Harris announced the arrest of Backpage CEO Carl Ferrer on felony charges of pimping a minor, pimping, and conspiracy to commit pimping. The warrant alleged that 99 percent of Backpage's revenue was directly attributable to prostitution-related ads, many of which involved victims of sex trafficking, including children under the age of 18. The pimping charge against Ferrer was dismissed by the California courts in 2016 on the grounds of Section 230 of the Communications Decency Act, but in 2018, Ferrer pleaded guilty in California to money laundering and agreed to give evidence against the former co-owners of Backpage. Ferrer simultaneously pleaded guilty to charges of money laundering and conspiracy to facilitate prostitution in Texas state court and Arizona federal court. Under pressure, Backpage announced that it was removing its adult section from all its U.S. sites. Harris welcomed the move, saying, "I look forward to them shutting down completely." The investigations continued after she became a senator, and, in April 2018, Backpage and affiliated sites were seized by federal law enforcement.

Transnational criminal organizations 

During her term as attorney general, Harris's office oversaw major investigations and prosecutions targeting transnational criminal organizations for their involvement in violent crime, fraud schemes, drug trafficking, and smuggling. Significant arrests and seizures (of weapons, drugs, cash, and other assets) under Harris targeted the Tijuana Cartel (2011), the Nuestra Familia, Norteños, and the Vagos Motorcycle Club (2011), the Norteños (2015), the Crips (2015), the Mexican Mafia (2016), and businesses in the Los Angeles Fashion District accused of operating a major money-laundering hub for Mexican narcotics traffickers (2014).

In summer 2012, Harris signed an accord with the Attorney General of Mexico, Marisela Morales, to improve coordination of law enforcement resources targeting transnational gangs engaging in the sale and trafficking of human beings across the San Ysidro border crossing. The accord called for closer integration on investigations between offices and sharing best practices. In 2012, Governor Jerry Brown signed into law two bills advanced by Harris to combat human trafficking. In November, Harris presented a report titled "The State of Human Trafficking in California 2012" at a symposium attended by U.S. Secretary of Labor Hilda Solis and Attorney General Morales, outlining the growing prevalence of human trafficking in the state, and highlighting the involvement of transnational gangs in the practice.

In early 2014, Harris issued a report titled, "Gangs Beyond Borders: California and the Fight Against Transnational Crime", addressing the prominent role of drug, weapons, and human trafficking, money laundering, and technology crimes employed by various drug cartels from Mexico, Armenian Power, 18th Street Gang, and MS-13 and offering recommendations for state and local law enforcement to combat the criminal activity. Later that year, Harris led a bipartisan delegation of state attorneys general to Mexico City to discuss transnational crime with Mexican prosecutors. Harris then convened a summit focused on the use of technology to fight transnational organized crime with state and federal officials from the U.S., Mexico, and El Salvador.

U.S. Senate (2017–2021)

Election 

After more than 20 years as a U.S. Senator from California, Senator Barbara Boxer announced in January 2015 that she would not run for reelection in 2016. Harris announced her candidacy for the Senate seat the following week. Harris was a top contender from the beginning of her campaign.

The 2016 California Senate election used California's new top-two primary format where the top two candidates in the primary would advance to the general election regardless of party. In February 2016, Harris won 78% of the California Democratic Party vote at the party convention, allowing Harris's campaign to receive financial support from the party. Three months later, Governor Jerry Brown endorsed her. In the June 7 primary, Harris came in first with 40% of the vote and won with pluralities in most counties. Harris faced congresswoman and fellow Democrat Loretta Sanchez in the general election. It was the first time a Republican did not appear in a general election for the Senate since California began directly electing senators in 1914.

On July 19, President Barack Obama and Vice President Joe Biden endorsed Harris. In the November 2016 election, Harris defeated Sanchez, capturing over 60% of the vote, carrying all but four counties. Following her victory, she promised to protect immigrants from the policies of President-elect Donald Trump and announced her intention to remain Attorney General through the end of 2016.

Tenure and political positions

2017 

On January 28, after Trump signed Executive Order 13769, barring citizens from several Muslim-majority countries from entering the U.S. for ninety days, she condemned the order and was one of many to describe it as a "Muslim ban". She called White House Chief of Staff John F. Kelly at home to gather information and push back against the executive order.

In February, Harris spoke in opposition to Trump's cabinet picks Betsy DeVos for Secretary of Education and Jeff Sessions for United States Attorney General. In early March, she called on Sessions to resign, after it was reported that Sessions spoke twice with Russian Ambassador to the United States Sergey Kislyak.

In April, Harris voted against the confirmation of Neil Gorsuch to the U.S. Supreme Court. Later that month, Harris took her first foreign trip to the Middle East, visiting California troops stationed in Iraq and the Zaatari refugee camp in Jordan, the largest camp for Syrian refugees.

In June, Harris garnered media attention for her questioning of Rod Rosenstein, the deputy attorney general, over the role he played in the May 2017 firing of James Comey, the director of the Federal Bureau of Investigation. The prosecutorial nature of her questioning caused Senator John McCain, an ex officio member of the Intelligence Committee, and Senator Richard Burr, the committee chairman, to interrupt her and request that she be more respectful of the witness. A week later, she questioned Jeff Sessions, the attorney general, on the same topic. Sessions said her questioning "makes me nervous". Burr's singling out of Harris sparked suggestions in the news media that his behavior was sexist, with commentators arguing that Burr would not treat a male Senate colleague in a similar manner.

In December, Harris called for the resignation of Senator Al Franken, asserting on Twitter, "Sexual harassment and misconduct should not be allowed by anyone and should not occur anywhere."

2018 

In January, Harris was appointed to the Senate Judiciary Committee after the resignation of Al Franken. Later that month, Harris questioned Homeland Security Secretary Kirstjen Nielsen for favoring Norwegian immigrants over others and claiming to be unaware that Norway is a predominantly white country.

In May, Harris heatedly questioned Secretary Nielsen about the Trump administration family separation policy, under which children were separated from their families when the parents were taken into custody for illegally entering the U.S. In June, after visiting one of the detention facilities near the border in San Diego, Harris became the first senator to demand Nielsen's resignation.

In the September and October Brett Kavanaugh Supreme Court confirmation hearings, Harris questioned Brett Kavanaugh about a meeting he may have had regarding the Mueller Investigation with a member of Kasowitz Benson Torres, the law firm founded by the President's personal attorney Marc Kasowitz. Kavanaugh was unable to answer and repeatedly deflected. Harris also participated in questioning the FBI director's limited scope of the investigation on Kavanaugh regarding allegations of sexual assault. She voted against his confirmation.

Harris was a target of the October 2018 United States mail bombing attempts.

In December, the Senate passed the Justice for Victims of Lynching Act (S. 3178), sponsored by Harris. The bill, which died in the House, would have made lynching a federal hate crime.

2019 

In March 2019, after Special Counsel Robert Mueller submitted his report on Russian interference in the 2016 election, Harris called for U.S. Attorney General William Barr to testify before Congress in the interests of transparency. Two days later, Barr released a four-page "summary" of the redacted Mueller Report, which was criticized as a deliberate mischaracterization of its conclusions. Later that month, Harris was one of twelve Democratic senators to sign a letter led by Mazie Hirono questioning Barr's decision to offer "his own conclusion that the President's conduct did not amount to obstruction of justice" and called for an investigation into whether Barr's summary of the Mueller Report and his statements at a news conference were misleading.

On May 1, 2019, Barr testified before the Senate Judiciary Committee. During the hearing, Barr remained defiant about the misrepresentations in the four-page summary he had released ahead of the full report. When asked by Harris if he had reviewed the underlying evidence before deciding not to charge the President with obstruction of justice, Barr admitted that neither he, Rod Rosenstein, nor anyone in his office reviewed the evidence supporting the report before making the charging decision. Harris later called for Barr to resign, and accused him of refusing to answer her questions because he could open himself up to perjury, and stating his responses disqualified him from serving as U.S. attorney general. Two days later, Harris demanded again that the Department of Justice inspector general Michael E. Horowitz investigate whether Attorney General Barr acceded to pressure from the White House to investigate Trump's political enemies.

On May 5, 2019, Harris said "voter suppression" prevented Democrats Stacey Abrams and Andrew Gillum from winning the 2018 gubernatorial elections in Georgia and Florida; Abrams lost by 55,000 votes and Gillum lost by 32,000 votes. According to election law expert Richard L. Hasen, "I have seen no good evidence that the suppressive effects of strict voting and registration laws affected the outcome of the governor's races in Georgia and Florida."

In July, Harris teamed with Kirsten Gillibrand to urge the Trump administration to investigate the allegations of Uyghur genocide by the Chinese Communist Party; in this question she was joined by colleague Marco Rubio.

In November, Harris called for an investigation into the death of Roxsana Hernández, a transgender woman and immigrant who died in ICE custody.

In December, Harris led a group of Democratic senators and civil rights organizations in demanding the removal of White House senior adviser Stephen Miller after emails published by the Southern Poverty Law Center revealed frequent promotion of white nationalist literature to Breitbart website editors.

2020 

Before the opening of the impeachment trial of Donald Trump on January 16, 2020, Harris delivered remarks on the floor of the Senate, stating her views on the integrity of the American justice system and the principle that nobody, including an incumbent president, is above the law. Harris later asked Senate Judiciary chairman Lindsey Graham to halt all judicial nominations during the impeachment trial, to which Graham acquiesced. Harris voted to convict the president on charges of abuse of power and obstruction of Congress.

Harris has worked on bipartisan bills with Republican co-sponsors, including a bail reform bill with Senator Rand Paul, an election security bill with Senator James Lankford, and a workplace harassment bill with Senator Lisa Murkowski.

2021 
Following her election as Vice President of the United States, Harris resigned from her seat on January 18, 2021, prior to taking office on January 20, 2021, and was replaced by California Secretary of State Alex Padilla.

Committee assignments 
While in the Senate, Harris was a member of the following committees:
 Committee on the Budget
 Committee on Homeland Security and Governmental Affairs
 Subcommittee on Federal Spending Oversight and Emergency Management
 Subcommittee on Regulatory Affairs and Federal Management
 Select Committee on Intelligence
 Committee on the Judiciary
 Subcommittee on the Constitution
 Subcommittee on Oversight, Agency Action, Federal Rights and Federal Courts
 Subcommittee on Privacy, Technology and the Law

Caucus memberships 
 Congressional Asian Pacific American Caucus
 Congressional Black Caucus
 Congressional Caucus for Women's Issues

2020 presidential election (2019–2020)

Presidential campaign 

Harris had been considered a top contender and potential frontrunner for the 2020 Democratic nomination for president. In June 2018, she was quoted as "not ruling it out". In July 2018, it was announced that she would publish a memoir, a sign of a possible run. On January 21, 2019, Harris officially announced her candidacy for president of the United States in the 2020 United States presidential election. In the first 24hours after her candidacy announcement, she tied a record set by Bernie Sanders in 2016 for the most donations raised in the day following an announcement. More than 20,000 people attended her formal campaign launch event in her hometown of Oakland, California, on January 27, according to a police estimate.

During the first Democratic presidential debate in June 2019, Harris scolded former vice president Joe Biden for "hurtful" remarks he made, speaking fondly of senators who opposed integration efforts in the 1970s and working with them to oppose mandatory school bussing. Harris's support rose by between six and nine points in polls following that debate. In the second debate in August, Harris was confronted by Biden and Congresswoman Tulsi Gabbard over her record as attorney general. The San Jose Mercury News assessed that some of Gabbard's and Biden's accusations were on point, such as blocking the DNA testing of a death row inmate, while others did not stand up to scrutiny. In the immediate aftermath, Harris fell in the polls following that debate. Over the next few months her poll numbers fell to the low single digits. At a time when liberals were increasingly concerned about the excesses of the criminal justice system, Harris faced criticism from reformers for tough-on-crime policies she pursued while she was California's attorney general. For example, in 2014, she decided to defend California's death penalty in court.

Prior to and during her presidential campaign an online informal organization using the hashtag #KHive formed to support her candidacy and defend her from racist and sexist attacks. According to the Daily Dot, Joy Reid first used the term in an August 2017 tweet saying "@DrJasonJohnson @ZerlinaMaxwell and I had a meeting and decided it's called the K-Hive."

On December 3, 2019, Harris withdrew from seeking the 2020 Democratic nomination, citing a shortage of funds. In March 2020, Harris endorsed Joe Biden for president.

Vice presidential campaign 

In May 2019, senior members of the Congressional Black Caucus endorsed the idea of a Biden–Harris ticket. In late February, Biden won a landslide victory in the 2020 South Carolina Democratic primary with the endorsement of House whip Jim Clyburn, with more victories on Super Tuesday. In early March, Clyburn suggested Biden choose a black woman as a running mate, commenting that "African American women needed to be rewarded for their loyalty". In March, Biden committed to choosing a woman for his running mate.

On April 17, 2020, Harris responded to media speculation and said she "would be honored" to be Biden's running mate. In late May, in relation to the murder of George Floyd and ensuing protests and demonstrations, Biden faced renewed calls to select a black woman to be his running mate, highlighting the law enforcement credentials of Harris and Val Demings.

On June 12, The New York Times reported that Harris was emerging as the frontrunner to be Biden's running mate, as she was the only African American woman with the political experience typical of vice presidents. On June 26, CNN reported that more than a dozen people close to the Biden search process considered Harris one of Biden's top four contenders, along with Elizabeth Warren, Val Demings, and Keisha Lance Bottoms.

On August 11, 2020, Biden announced that he had chosen Harris. She was the first African American, the first Indian American, and the third woman after Geraldine Ferraro and Sarah Palin to be picked as the vice-presidential nominee for a major party ticket. Harris is also the first resident of the Western United States to appear on the Democratic Party's national ticket. 

Harris became the vice president–elect following the Biden-Harris ticket's victory in the 2020 United States presidential election. After the major networks called the election for Biden/Harris, Harris was recorded calling Biden, saying, "We did it! We did it, Joe. You're going to be the next President of the United States." The quote became one of the top 10 tweets of 2020.

Vice presidency (2021–present)

Following the election of Joe Biden as U.S. president in the 2020 election, Harris assumed office as vice president of the United States on January 20, 2021. She is the United States' first female vice president, the highest-ranking female elected official in U.S. history, and the first African-American and first Asian-American vice president. She is also the second person of color to hold the post, preceded by Charles Curtis, a Native American and member of the Kaw Nation, who served under Herbert Hoover from 1929 to 1933. She is the third person with acknowledged non-European ancestry to reach one of the highest offices in the executive branch, after Curtis and former president Barack Obama.

Harris resigned her Senate seat on January 18, 2021, two days before her swearing-in as vice president. Her first act as vice president was swearing in her replacement Alex Padilla and Georgia senators Raphael Warnock and Jon Ossoff, who were elected in the 2021 Georgia runoff elections. 

Upon taking office on January 20, 2021, the 117th Congress's Senate was divided 50–50 between Republicans and Democrats; this meant that Harris had to be frequently called upon to exercise her power to cast tie-breaking votes as president of the Senate. Harris cast her first two tie-breaking votes on February 5, 2021. In February and March, Harris's tie-breaking votes were crucial in passing the American Rescue Plan Act of 2021 stimulus package proposed by President Biden since no Republicans in the Senate voted for the package. On July 20, 2021, Harris broke Mike Pence's record for tie-breaking votes in the first year of a vice presidency when she cast the seventh tie-breaking vote in her first six months and cast 13 tie-breaking votes during her first year in office, the most tie-breaking votes in a single year in U.S. history, surpassing John Adams who cast 12 votes in 1790. As of March 2023, Harris is tied with John Adams for the second most tie-breaking votes by a vice president with 29, trailing only John C. Calhoun who cast 31 votes as vice president.

In a debunked story by the New York Post in April 2021, it was claimed that Harris's children's book Superheroes Are Everywhere was being distributed en masse through "welcome kits" given to migrant children at a shelter in Long Beach, California. In reality, only a single copy of the book had been donated by a member of the public. The writer of the original story, Laura Italiano, claimed that she was forced to write the story against her will and she resigned from the New York Post as a result.

In April 2021, Harris indicated that she was the last person in the room before President Biden decided to remove all U.S. troops from Afghanistan and commented that the president has "an extraordinary amount of courage" and "make(s) decisions based on what he truly believes ... is the right thing to do." National Security Advisor Jake Sullivan said that Biden "insists she be in every core decision-making meeting. She weighs in during those meetings, often providing unique perspectives."

On March 24, 2021, Biden tasked Harris to reduce the number of unaccompanied minors and adult asylum seekers. She is also tasked with leading the negotiations with Mexico, Honduras, Guatemala and El Salvador. Harris conducted her first international trip as vice president in June 2021, visiting Guatemala and Mexico in an attempt to address the root causes of an increase in migration from Central America to the United States. During her visit, in a joint press conference with Guatemalan President Alejandro Giammattei, Harris issued an appeal to potential migrants, stating "I want to be clear to folks in the region who are thinking about making that dangerous trek to the United States-Mexico border: Do not come. Do not come." Her work in Central America led to creation of task forces on corruption and human trafficking; a women's empowerment program, and an investment fund for housing and businesses.

Harris met with French President Emmanuel Macron in November 2021 to strengthen ties after the cancellation of a submarine program.

Nearing ten months in office, approval ratings for the president and the vice president were 38% and 28%, respectively. At 28%, Harris had the lowest approval rating of any modern VP; the prior record having been Dick Cheney's 30% at the end of his second term.

On November 19, 2021, Harris served as acting president from 10:10 to 11:35 am EST, while President Biden underwent a colonoscopy. She became the first woman, and the third person overall, to assume the powers and duties of the U.S. presidency under Section 3 of the Twenty-fifth Amendment.

Harris's term in office has seen high staff turnovers that included her chief of staff, deputy chief of staff, press secretary, deputy press secretary, communications director, and chief speechwriter. An anonymous source said that they resigned because they and other staffers "often feel mistreated" by senior staffers. "Symone Sanders, senior advisor and chief spokesperson for Harris, pushed back against the complaints" and defended their management style, especially for giving opportunities to Black women.

Awards and honors 

In 2005, the National Black Prosecutors Association awarded Harris the Thurgood Marshall Award. That year, she was included in a Newsweek report profiling "20 of America's Most Powerful Women". A 2008 New York Times article published later that year also identified her as a woman with potential to become president of the United States, highlighting her reputation as a "tough fighter".

In 2013, 2020, and 2021, Time included Harris on the Time 100, Time's annual list of the 100 most influential people in the world. In 2016, the 20/20 Bipartisan Justice Center awarded Harris the Bipartisan Justice Award along with Senator Tim Scott. Biden and Harris were jointly named Time Person of the Year for 2020.

Harris was selected for the inaugural 2021 Forbes 50 Over 50; made up of entrepreneurs, leaders, scientists and creators who are over the age of 50.

Personal life

Harris met her husband, attorney Doug Emhoff, through a mutual friend who set up Harris and Emhoff on a blind date in 2013. Emhoff was an entertainment lawyer who became partner-in-charge at Venable LLP's Los Angeles office. Harris and Emhoff were married on August 22, 2014, in Santa Barbara, California. Harris is a stepmother to Emhoff's two children, Cole and Ella, from his previous marriage to the film producer Kerstin Emhoff. As of August 2019, Harris and her husband had an estimated net worth of $5.8million.

Harris is a multiracial American and a Baptist, holding membership of the Third Baptist Church of San Francisco, a congregation of the American Baptist Churches USA. She is a member of The Links.

Harris's sister, Maya, is a lawyer and MSNBC political analyst; her brother-in-law, Tony West, is general counsel of Uber and a former United States Department of Justice senior official. Her niece, Meena, is the founder of the Phenomenal Women Action Campaign and former head of strategy and leadership at Uber.

Publications 
Harris has written two non-fiction books and one children's book.

See also 

 Black women in American politics
 List of African-American United States Cabinet members
 List of African-American United States senators
 List of female state attorneys general in the United States
 List of female United States Cabinet members
 List of female United States presidential and vice presidential candidates
 List of United States politicians of Indian descent
 List of United States senators from California
 Women in the United States Senate

Notes

References

External links

Official

Other 
 
 
 Kamala Harris at On the Issues
 Kamala Harris at PolitiFact

 
1964 births
Living people
20th-century American politicians
20th-century American women politicians
21st-century American memoirists
21st-century American politicians
21st-century American women politicians
21st-century American women writers
2020 United States vice-presidential candidates
21st-century vice presidents of the United States
Acting presidents of the United States
Activists from the San Francisco Bay Area
African-American candidates for President of the United States
African-American candidates for Vice President of the United States
African-American lawyers
African-American members of the Cabinet of the United States
African-American memoirists
African-American people in California politics
African-American United States senators
African-American women in politics
African-American women lawyers
Alpha Kappa Alpha members
American anti-lynching activists
American people of Indian Tamil descent
American politicians of Indian descent
American politicians of Jamaican descent
American prosecutors
American women lawyers
American women memoirists
Asian-American members of the Cabinet of the United States
Asian-American United States senators
Baptists from California
Joe Biden 2020 presidential campaign
Biden administration cabinet members
California Attorneys General
California Democrats
California politicians of Indian descent
Candidates in the 2020 United States presidential election
Democratic Party United States senators from California
Democratic Party vice presidents of the United States
District attorneys in California
Female candidates for President of the United States
Female candidates for Vice President of the United States
Female United States senators
Harris family
Howard University alumni
Lawyers from Oakland, California
Members of the United States Congress of Indian descent
Politicians from Oakland, California
Time Person of the Year
University of California, Hastings College of the Law alumni
Vice presidents of the United States
Women in California politics
Women members of the Cabinet of the United States
Women vice presidents
Writers from Oakland, California